Makhmadbek Makhmadbekov (born 1 October 1999) is a Russian judoka. He is the gold medallist in the -73 kg at the 2021 Judo Grand Slam Kazan

References

External links
 

1999 births
Living people
Russian male judoka
20th-century Russian people
21st-century Russian people